City Journal is a public policy magazine and website, published by the conservative Manhattan Institute for Policy Research, that covers a range of topics on urban affairs, such as policing, education, housing, and other issues. The magazine also publishes articles on arts and culture, urban architecture, family culture, and other topics. The magazine began publishing in 1990.

History
City Journal was founded in 1990 by William M. H. Hammett, who served as the head of the conservative Manhattan Institute. Hammett positioned City Journal as a more moderate and more cosmopolitan alternative to established right-wing institutions. The magazine initially published articles promoting privatization, fiscal discipline, government downsizing, and educational vouchers. Other New York-related topics covered in the magazine included criticisms of open admissions at CUNY, and the promotion of broken-windows policing.

2020s 
During the early 2020s, City Journal has attracted widespread national attention for its role in elevating debates on critical race theory, LGBTQ+ topics in education, and similar issues in the United States. Contributor Christopher Rufo, in particular, has drawn attention for writing numerous pieces in the magazine that often focus on these matters. In articles published by City Journal, Rufo has accused Seattle's Office of Civil Rights of "endorsing principles of segregationism, group-based guilt, and race essentialism", highlighted Disney and Twitter workers who have been convicted of child sexual abuse, suggested that there were significant levels of "'grooming' in public schools", accused a California curriculum designer of wanting to make children "chant to the gods Quetzalcoatl, Huitzilopochtli, and Xipe Totek", compared the diversity training conducted by the city of Seattle to "cult programming", and accused an Oregon school district of promoting revolutionary Marxist ideas.

Publication
The magazine is published by the conservative Manhattan Institute for Policy Research a national free-market think tank based in New York City. It was edited by Peter Salins and then Fred Siegel in the early 1990s. Myron Magnet, its editor from 1994 to 2006, is now editor-at-large. City Journals current editor is Brian C. Anderson, who was appointed in late 2006 after serving as senior editor for 10 years. The journal's contributors include experts such as Senior Fellow Heather Mac Donald, Edward Glaeser, Steven Malanga, Nicole Gelinas, Kay Hymowitz, John Tierney, and Joel Kotkin. Although City Journal is based in New York City, its scope is national and often international, through the contributions of writers including Theodore Dalrymple from Britain, Claire Berlinski and Guy Sorman from France, and Bruce Bawer in Norway.

The magazine was also notable as one of the first to link to blogs on its website that referenced it, and to engage directly with the blogosphere. City Journal has published several special issues, beginning in autumn 2009. Subsequently, City Journal has put out special issues in autumn 2013, summer 2016, and spring 2017. The 2009 and 2013 special issues were focused on policy agendas for New York State and City. In 2016, City Journal published a special issue on the state of Texas, called "Texas Rising", and in 2017, City Journal considered the future of work and labor in an increasingly automated world, in an issue titled "The Shape of Work to Come".

Website
All articles from the print magazine are eventually published online at City Journals website, which also publishes original content (not from the magazine) daily, Mondays through Fridays. The first piece of new content for each week gets posted Sunday afternoon or evening. Original web pieces are generally shorter than the features in the print magazine, being typically about the length of an op-ed. They cover everything from public-policy issues and political developments to economics and popular culture.

Additionally, the website hosts City Journals weekly podcast, 10 Blocks, which launched in February 2016. 10 Blocks features discussions on urban policy and culture with host Brian C. Anderson and City Journal editors, contributors, and special guests. Episodes cover topics such as: predictive policing; the Bronx renaissance; reform of the Port Authority of New York and New Jersey; homelessness in Portland, Oregon.

Reception 
Much of the reception of City Journal over the years has been divided along political lines.

The magazine has received praise from the political right: the editorial board of the conservative New York Post described it as "the magazine that helped save New York City"; conservative commentator Jay Nordlinger, writing in National Review, called City Journal "a beacon of civilization". In 2016, City Journal ranked second in The Global Grids "Top 20 Urban Planning Websites", and again made the list in 2017, ranked fourth.

Alice O'Connor, a professor at the University of California, Santa Barbara, has written that City Journal is "hardly a model of ideological moderation", and that its contributors are "enmeshed in 1960s- and 1970s-era urbanology". She has criticized multiple writers for City Journal for reviving a "relentlessly negative image of black cultural pathology to call for tougher measures to crack down on out-of-wedlock births", following articles praising Daniel P. Moynihan's The Negro Family: The Case For National Action. Conservative author Sol Stern, a major contributor for the magazine since its inception, published a piece in liberal journal Democracy in 2020, accusing City Journal of removing contributors' editorial independence, and criticized the association of magazine trustee Rebekah Mercer with the alt-right outlet Breitbart.

Notable contributors

 Brian C. Anderson, editor of City Journal
 Steven Malanga, senior fellow and senior editor
 Claire Berlinski, contributor
 Coleman Hughes, contributing editor
 Theodore Dalrymple, contributing editor
 Edward Glaeser, senior fellow and contributing editor to City Journal
 Victor Davis Hanson, contributing editor
 Howard Husock, contributor
 Kay Hymowitz, senior fellow and contributing editor to City Journal
 Andrew Klavan, contributing editor
 Joel Kotkin, contributor
 John Leo, contributor
 Heather Mac Donald, senior fellow and contributing editor
 Myron Magnet, editor-at-large
 John O. McGinnis, contributor
 Judith Miller, adjunct fellow and contributing editor
 Lance Morrow, contributor
 Ian Penman, contributor
 Fred Siegel, senior fellow and contributing editor to City Journal
 Guy Sorman, contributing editor
 Harry Stein, contributing editor
 Sol Stern, adjunct fellow and contributing editor
 John Tierney, contributing editor
 Michael J. Totten, contributor
 John Stossel, video contributor

See also
Economics Does Not Lie

References

External links

Conservative magazines published in the United States
Magazines established in 1990
Manhattan Institute for Policy Research
Political magazines published in the United States
Quarterly magazines published in the United States